Sir Narayan Ganesh Chandavarkar (2 December 1855 – 4 May 1923) was an early Indian National Congress politician and Hindu reformer. He was regarded by some as the "leading Hindu reformer of western India".

Early life
Narayan Ganesh Chandavarkar was born in Honavar in the Bombay Presidency on 2 December 1855. His maternal uncle was Shamrao Vithal Kaikini, another notable reformer from the Chitrapur Saraswat Brahmin  community. He served as a Dakshina Fellow in Elphinstone College for some time before earning a law degree in 1881. Shortly before the Indian National Congress was founded in 1885, N. G. Chandavarkar went to England as a member of the three-man delegation. The group was sent to educate public opinion about India right before general elections took place in England.  G.L. Chandavarkar writes

Career
He was the vice chancellor of the university of Bombay.He was elected the president of the annual session of the Indian National Congress in 1900
and one year later he was promoted to the high bench at the Bombay High Court. He took a break from politics for the next twelve years and devoted his time to the judicial system and various social groups till 1913. The main social group he worked with was the Prarthana Samaj ("Prayer Society"). He took the leadership reins from Mahadev Govind Ranade after the death of the latter in 1901. The organization was inspired by the Brahmo Samaj and was involved in the modernization of Hindu society.

Chandavarkar was knighted in the 1910 New Year Honours List.

Return to politics
He returned to the realm of Indian politics in 1914. A schism in the Congress in 1918 came to separate the organization into two camps. Chandavarkar became the head of the All-India Moderates Conference in 1918 along with Surendranath Banerjea and Dinshaw Wacha. In 1920 "he presided over the public meeting held in Bombay to protest against the report of the Hunter Committee on the Jallianwala Bagh atrocities which was appointed by the Government of India." Mahatma Gandhi was inspired by this to move a resolution on the topic. Later, on Chandavarkar's advice, Gandhi called off his Civil Disobedience campaign in 1921.

Notable quotes
Noting the general trend of Hindu reform movements in the early twentieth century he remarked

References

Indian National Congress politicians from Karnataka
1855 births
Marathi people
Hindu law jurists
People from Uttara Kannada
Presidents of the Indian National Congress
1923 deaths
Judges of the Bombay High Court
Knights Bachelor
Indian Knights Bachelor
Hindu reformers
19th-century Indian politicians
20th-century Indian politicians
19th-century Indian judges
20th-century Indian judges
Members of the Bombay Legislative Council
Prarthana Samaj